Presidential elections were held in Cameroon on 5 April 1980. The country was a one-party state at the time, with the Cameroonian National Union as the sole legal party. Its leader, Ahmadou Ahidjo, was the only candidate in the election, and won unopposed. Voter turnout was 99.0%.

Results

References

Cameroon
1980 in Cameroon
Presidential elections in Cameroon
One-party elections
Single-candidate elections
April 1980 events in Africa